Renata Moreira (26 November 1991) is an Ecuadorian beauty pageant titleholder who was crowned Miss Italia Nel Mondo Ecuador 2011 and will represent her country in the 2011 Miss Italia Nel Mondo pageant.

Personal life
Born to an Ecuadorian father and an Italian mother. Moreira is studying commerce, and speaks Spanish, English and Italian.

Miss Ecuador 2009
Prior to her participation in Miss Ecuador 2009, Renata was Reina de Santo Domingo 2009 and Reina de Mi Tierra 2009, triumph that allows her to compete in Miss Ecuador the next year, where she won Best Fegure and Best Face awards.

Miss Teen International 2009

Miss Italia Nel Mondo 2011
Moreira Tortorelli, as an Italian descendant, competed in the national pageant of Miss Italia Nel Mondo where she won the title. On July 4, 2011 she competed in Miss Italia Nel Mondo where she finished on top 6.

References

External links
Official Miss Ecuador website

1991 births
Living people
Ecuadorian beauty pageant winners
Ecuadorian people of Italian descent